The Abbey of San Pancrazio al Fango is a ruined abbey in the comune of Grosseto, Tuscany, Italy.

It is situated between Grosseto and Castiglione della Pescaia, in the heart of the Nature Reserve Diaccia Botrona, not far from the Fattoria della Badiola. The church, which is now in ruins, was built in the Middle Ages on a slight hill overlooking the surrounding wetlands, once occupied by Prile Lake near a building from Roman times.

References

Roman Catholic churches in Grosseto
Monasteries in Tuscany
Buildings and structures in Grosseto